The 2014 RLIF Awards were presented on Friday 19 December 2014, recognizing achievements in the sport of rugby league in the year of 2014.

The 2014 RLIF Awards were marked by inaugural awards ceremony and featured new awards, notably the Rugby League International Federation Player of the Year Award. Other awards included the Rookie of Year, for players who made their Test debut and were under 21 years of age in the awards year, the Nations’ International Players of the Year, selected by each nation's governing body from the 17 teams that were involved in significant international events and the Spirit of Rugby League, for those who have made significant contributions to the sport in their lifetime.

Awards
note awards are shown for the past seven years (including 2014).
For awards presented with nominees, winners are listed first and highlighted in boldface.

References

RLIF Awards
RLIF Awards
RLIF Awards